The Ciucurova (also: Slava Cercheză) is a left tributary of the river Slava in Romania. It flows into the Slava in Slava Rusă.

References

Rivers of Romania
1Ciucurova
Rivers of Tulcea County